The Cardboard Swords were an American indie pop rock band from Grand Rapids, Michigan.

History
In early 2015, The Cardboard Swords signed to Count Your Lucky Stars Records. Not long after, they were featured on a split released by the label alongside Dowsing, Sinai Vessel, and Long Knives. In late 2015, The Cardboard Swords released their self-titled first full-length album.

Band members
Tyler DeCoeur – Vocals and Guitar
Tim Barrett – Guitar and Vocals
Jeremy Dye – Bass and Vocals
Sam Padalino – Drums and Vocals

Discography
Studio albums
Once More, There Is Nothing Left To  Figure Out (2018, self-released)
The Cardboard Swords (2015, Count Your Lucky Stars)
Splits
CYLS Split Series 4 (2015, Count Your Lucky Stars)

References

Indie pop groups from Michigan
Musical groups from Grand Rapids, Michigan
Musical groups established in 2015
2015 establishments in Michigan
Count Your Lucky Stars Records artists